Sander Arends and Tristan-Samuel Weissborn were the defending champions but only Weissborn chose to defend his title, partnering Dino Marcan. Weissborn lost in the quarterfinals to Hugo Nys and Max Schnur.

Roman Jebavý and Antonio Šančić won the title after defeating Adil Shamasdin and Igor Zelenay 6–4, 6–1 in the final.

Seeds

Draw

External Links
 Main Draw
 Qualifying Draw

Heilbronner Neckarcup - Doubles
2017 Doubles